The Cedar River is a river in the Hudson Bay drainage basin in the Unorganized Part of Kenora District in northwestern Ontario in Canada. The river is a left tributary of the English River.

Course
The river begins at the outflow from Cedar Lake and flows north to through Church Lake to Perrault Lake where it takes in the right tributary Ord River. The Cedar River flows via the Winnipeg River and the Nelson River to Hudson Bay.

Tributaries
Sherin Creek (right)
Anishinabi River (left)
Wabaskang Lake
Aerobus Creek (left)
Florence Creek (right)
Ord River (right)

See also
List of rivers of Ontario

References

Sources

Rivers of Kenora District
Tributaries of Hudson Bay